The 1930 Detroit Tigers season was a season in American baseball. The team finished fifth in the American League with a record of 75–79, 27 games behind the Philadelphia Athletics.

Regular season

Season standings

Record vs. opponents

Notable transactions 
 May 30, 1930: Harry Rice, Ownie Carroll and Yats Wuestling were traded by the Tigers to the New York Yankees for Waite Hoyt and Mark Koenig.

Roster

Player stats

Batting

Starters by position 
Note: Pos = Position; G = Games played; AB = At bats; H = Hits; Avg. = Batting average; HR = Home runs; RBI = Runs batted in

Other batters 
Note: G = Games played; AB = At bats; H = Hits; Avg. = Batting average; HR = Home runs; RBI = Runs batted in

Pitching

Starting pitchers 
Note: G = Games pitched; IP = Innings pitched; W = Wins; L = Losses; ERA = Earned run average; SO = Strikeouts

Other pitchers 
Note: G = Games pitched; IP = Innings pitched; W = Wins; L = Losses; ERA = Earned run average; SO = Strikeouts

Relief pitchers 
Note: G = Games pitched; W = Wins; L = Losses; SV = Saves; ERA = Earned run average; SO = Strikeouts

Farm system 

Hartford club folded, June 30, 1930

Notes

References 

1930 Detroit Tigers season at Baseball Reference

Detroit Tigers seasons
Detroit Tigers season
Detroit Tigers
1930 in Detroit